Chris Brown is an American singer, songwriter and actor who has appeared in many music videos. His videography consists of sixty-four music videos, five guest appearances, four video albums, four film appearances and four television appearances. Brown's first music video was for his debut single "Run It!", taken from his self-titled debut album. Directed by Erik White, the video "introduced the world" to Brown's dance moves. White and Brown directed the accompanying music video for the second single "Yo (Excuse Me Miss)", which made reference to Michael Jackson. Some of Brown's other videos have been noted for its similarities to Jackson's work, including his music videos for "Wall to Wall" (2007), "Yeah 3x" (2010), "She Ain't You" (2011) and "Turn Up the Music" (2012). In 2007, Brown made his acting debut in the film, Stomp the Yard, as Duron. That same year, he also appeared in This Christmas as Michael "Baby" Whitfield. Brown's music video for the single "Forever" (2008) was directed by Joseph Kahn and was "highly regarded as one of the best videos of 2008". It earned Brown three nominations at the 2008 MTV Video Music Awards in the categories of Best Dancing in a Video, Best Choreography and Video of the Year.

Joseph Kahn also directed the music videos for the singles "I Can Transform Ya" and "Crawl", taken from Brown's third studio album Graffiti (2009). In 2010, Brown appeared in the film, Takers, as Jesse Attica. Which he produced as well His music video for "Look at Me Now" (from his fourth studio album F.A.M.E.) was well received by critics for displaying various colors and intricate routines performed by Brown and several dancers. It won Video of the Year at the 2011 BET Awards. Colin Tilley directed the video for "Next to You" — a collaboration with Justin Bieber, which was set in a post-apocalyptic environment. The music video for "Beautiful People" featured personal footage of Brown's everyday life and cameo appearances from Diddy, Brandy, Bow Wow, T-Pain, Nelly and Timbaland, among others. In 2012, Brown starred in the film, Think Like a Man, as Alex.

Music videos

As lead artist

As featured artist

Guest appearances

Filmography

Films

Television

Video albums

References

Brown, Chris
Videography